HD 202206 c is an extrasolar planet discovered on November 16, 2004, using long-term observation of a formerly unconfirmed second planet after the discovery of a brown dwarf (first companion) around the star HD 202206. This was the first circumbinary planet to be found around a main sequence star.

The planet orbits 3.07 times further out and is 85% less massive than the first companion, having a semi-amplitude of only 42 m/s. Its minimum mass is 2.44 times that of Jupiter and its diameter is likely roughly the same size as Jupiter's. The orbital resonance of the planet orbiting the brown dwarf is 5:1. The eccentricity of the planet is higher than that of all the planets and dwarf planets in the Solar System except Eris, which has an eccentricity of 0.44.

Further observation of this system via astrometry revised this picture in 2017, showing that HD 202206 c is a brown dwarf or super-Jupiter, with a true mass 17.9 times that of Jupiter, in a circumbinary orbit around a pair of co-orbiting stars being viewed nearly face-on.

References

External links 
EPE: HD 202206 c  on The Extrasolar Planets Encyclopaedia

Capricornus (constellation)
Giant planets
Exoplanets discovered in 2004
Exoplanets detected by radial velocity
Exoplanets detected by astrometry